There is very scarce information regarding women in pre-Islamic Arabia. Most of it originates from Hadith and historical traditions, pre-Islamic poetry, and early biographical accounts, or from conclusions from Qur'anic statements.

According to Islamic history sources, the first wife of Muhammad, Khadija, was a prosperous business woman who proposed to Muhammad (as opposed to being proposed to). They additionally say the wife of his chief-rival, Abu Sufyan (Hind), was politically active and was present at the Battle of Badr including conflicting accounts of her personally defiling the body of one of Muhammad's uncles.

Legal status and treatment

Tribe
Many assumptions have been made about pre-Islamic law due to discrepancies in the understanding of how law was enacted within the Arabian society. The main functional unit of the Arabian society, the tribe, was composed of those who had connections to a common relative. The tribe itself was tied together by a mutual understanding of spoken rules which could vary considerably depending on the tribe and its economic activities, including women's roles and rights. The rules were enforced by the tribal leader who also mediated the discussion of new laws. Individual men within the tribe were allowed to suggest new rules, but they would not be enacted until a consensus had been reached by the entire group. Many of these tribes were of patrilineal descent and therefore were only formed by male links traced down from each generation. In the tribal society, women generally had no right to dictate who they chose to marry. However, the tribe did offer the woman protection if she was maltreated by her husband. 

During the pre-Islamic times between 3500 and 3000 BCE, many of the city-states containing the individual tribes continually changed who had the authority to dictate. Much of this change occurred due to the tribal warfare taking place among these tribes. As the governmental power continued to be overturned and replaced, the laws towards women became more limiting as time went on. For some time, husbands had the right to pawn their wives and children, beat them mercilessly, or pull their hair without being penalized for these actions. The only chief right a woman had during these times was stated in the Code of Hammurabi in 1752 BCE, "women could obtain a divorce only with great difficulty. If a woman so hated her husband, that she has declared, 'you may not have me', her record shall be investigated at her city council". The quote further goes on to state that if the court does not find the wife to be at fault, then she will be allowed to return to her father's home.

Veiling
During pre-Islamic times, the Assyrian law clearly depicted within their written regulation who was allowed to veil. Those women who were family to "seigniors" had to veil as well as those who were previously prostitutes but now married. Laws on veiling were so strict that intolerable consequences were enacted for these women, some of which included being severely beaten or cutting their ears off. Prostitutes and slaves were prohibited from veiling. The veil was not only used to classifying women according to their status, but it also labeled them based on their sexual activity and marital status.

Women of upper class status
While the general population, of women in pre-Islamic Arabia did not have many rights, upper-class women had more. Many became 'naditum', or priestesses, which would in turn give them even more rights. These women were able to own and inherit property. In addition, the naditum were able to play an active role in the economic life of their community. The Samad Late Iron Age population in central Oman show archaeologically women of both high and low social rank.

Marriage practices

In pre-Islamic Arabia, a variety of different marriage practices existed. The most common and recognized types of marriage at this time consisted of: marriage by agreement, marriage by capture, marriage by purchase, marriage by inheritance and Mut'ah or temporary marriage.

Family structure and motherhood

Research on the family structure of pre-Islamic Arabia has many ambiguous views so it becomes difficult to know the exact structure of the family during this time period. Family structure that may have been of a typical tribe during pre-Islamic Arabia was patriarchal and the relations in the family were between other relations with men. It was vital for families to have boys rather than girls because men were viewed as superior to women. Within the family the women did not have any parental rights over their children even if the father had died, and it is claimed that women had no rights of inheritance.  However, it is clear that many widows were able to inherit from their husbands and were quite wealthy, Muhammad's wife Khadija and many other early widows of Islam included, before the surahs on inheritance were given. One of the most important roles of the mother within the household was for her to give birth to children, and to produce male offspring. Even though women had little rights within the household they did partake in few roles within society. Some of the activities the women did were making meals, milking animals, washing clothes, preparing butter, weaving material for tents, and spinning wool.

During pre-Islamic Arabian times, the child mortality rate was very high, and it was very common for parents to lose a child in infancy or during the child's childhood due to certain diseases and ailments. If the infant survived the community would hold a social feast in celebration of the infant's survival where they would name the child, and slaughter a sheep in honor of the child's birth. Children were not at fault for the same criminal punishments as adults. During this time period, it was seen as high importance for women to produce male offspring because they were seen as superior and also as the most fundamental component to be able to fight in the difficult desert conditions.

Family planning was very important and certain aspects are put into place before anything takes course, but the family planning did not apply to everyone. People were concerned with circumstances that may impact their family and or the community. The process of planning the family structure is mutually between the husband and wife. An important aspect of the family structure is determining the number of children the mother has, and spacing out the pregnancies as a way to make sure the health of the mother and children are not at risk, and also strengthen the well-being of the family. People also enforced the importance of having the mother breast-feed, which was an infant's basic right for two years.

Female infanticide
There is a great deal of scholarly debate concerning the prevalence of infanticide, more specifically female infanticide in pre-Islamic Arabia. The pre-Islamic era, known as the age of Jahiliya, meaning the age of barbarism, darkness, and ignorance of God's guidance comes directly from the Quran (3:154, 5:50, 33:33, 48:26). Pre-Islamic era is the time before the birth of Muhammad and the rise of Islam. The absence of reliable historical sources and factual information, aside from Islamic traditionists' sources and stories, make ascertaining the truth about the pre-Islamic way of life and culture almost impossible to substantiate. Some scholars rely on the Quran and Hadith to gain information about pre-Islamic Arabia. Since there was no fully developed system of writing in Arabia during this time period, the sources are limited to traditions, legends, proverbs and above all to poems; most of which were not recorded in writing for an additional two to four hundred years later, during the second and third centuries of the Hijrah. In rare cases we find sources of infanticide recorded in Arabic poetry.

Historically, the various cultural purposes of the practice of infanticide in other societies over time has been the reduction of population numbers, removal of defectives which includes babies with physical abnormalities and sick infants, elimination of social illegitimates, manipulation of sex ratio, or reactions to the loss of the mother during childbirth. Specifically, the Quran mentions the presence of infanticide in the Arabian society during Jahiliya. Infanticide in the Quran is referred to as "qatl al-awlad" which means killing children both males and females. Outside of the Quran, namely in the Hadith-literature, it includes broader actions like coitus interruptus, called "wad khafiyy" or hidden infanticide, and abortion known as "ijhad", as well as to kill a newborn whereby the practice to bury the infant alive so no blood was shed was considered humane and hence not murder. A description is given of digging a hole next to the mother and when she gives birth to an unwanted female child, although on occasion it might also be a male child, the newborn was directly buried in the hole). Other ways of committing infanticide have been mentioned in the fiqh collections, as well the hadith reports that include hurling infants off of cliffs and drowning them in wine and leaving them in the woods for wild animals.

According to interpretations of the Quran, infanticide was a means for the prevention of poverty and considered to be solution for the liability of a female child. Some sources indicate that males were considered stronger in pagan tribal societies and females were an economic burden, especially during times of famine because they were less useful. The father's disappointment and fear of the female being held captive by an opposing tribe, which would bring shame to the family.

See also
Women in Arab societies
Women in Islam

References

Islam and women
Pre-Islamic Arabia
Women in pre-Islamic Arabia